Ewens is a surname. Notable people with this surname include:

 Leonard Ewens, Australian politician, mayor of Walkerville
 Maurice Ewens (1611–1687), English Jesuit and author
 Percival Ewens, English cricket player
 Warren Ewens (born 1937), Australian mathematician

See also
 Ewens Ponds, Australia